Dumaguete Science High School is a public science high school in Dumaguete, Philippines.  It is a DepEd-recognized science high school and serves as the Regional Science High School for the Central Visayas region.

History
The school was founded and established in 1988 per Ordinance No. 81, Resolution No. 6 dated August 10, 1988, upon the recommendation of the Board of Directors of the Dumaguete Science Foundation, Inc. which is the resourcing arm of the school to maintain and sustain its operation.

RTPM - Dumaguete Science High School, started as a single-level and single-class high school temporarily occupying an area within the campus of the Dumaguete City National High School in Calindagan. It moved to its permanent school site in Villa Amada Subdivision of Barangay Daro on land donated by Ramon Teves-Pastor, in 1991 and has since grown from a single classroom within other city schools to a complete high school of more than 40 students.

On July 21, 1993, the RTPM – Dumaguete Science High School was integrated into the national roll by virtue of DECS Order No. 69, s. 1993 as among the thirteen Regional Science High Schools throughout the country (now composed of sixteen regions). It is one of the top high schools in the region.

The school also served as Regional Science High School for the short-lived Negros Island Region (Region XVIII) under the new setup of the national government to establish DepEd Regional Office in Dumaguete. However, the region only existed from May 29, 2015, through Executive Order No. 183 signed by former late President Benigno Aquino III and later abolished by former President Rodrigo Duterte on August 9, 2017, through signed Executive Order No. 38 to revoke EO No. 183. DepEd Regional Office for Negros Island Region in Dumaguete became what is now the DepEd Sub-Regional Office of Region VII when the province of Negros Oriental returned to Central Visayas and the school once again served as RSHS for its original region.

In 2016 the school was extended to include a senior high school teaching up to grade 12.

Facilities

Socorro Building
The newest building of RTPM-DSHS is primarily used as a science laboratory but now is also used for second-year classes. This new academic structure was constructed on March 23, 2009, and completed on August 23, 2009, situated nearby the Senior High School Building.

Library

The school library is located near the gate of RTPM-DSHS. The current librarian of RTPM-DSHS is Melinda C. Favor. Mrs. Melinda C. Favor specializes in teaching Technical Writing which is a form of technical communication, or simply, a style of formal writing used in fields as diverse as computer hardware and software, chemistry, the aerospace industry, robotics, finance, and consumer electronics, and biotechnology. Technical writers explain the technology and related ideas to technical and non-technical audiences. This could mean, for example, telling a programmer how to use a software library or telling a consumer how to operate a television remote control.

Student levels 
Ramon Teves Pastor Memorial - Dumaguete Science High School consists of four year levels namely Discoverers, Seekers, Probers, and Researchers. As of 2015, the Grade 7 Students are identified as Innovators, the Grade 8 Students are identified as Probers, the Grade 9 Students are identified as Seekers, the Grade 10 Students are identified as Analysts, the Grade 11 Students are identified as Discoverers, and the Grade 12 Students are identified as Researchers. The students are called Duscians.

References

Science high schools in the Philippines
Regional Science High School Union
Schools in Dumaguete
High schools in Negros Oriental